Anolis lemurinus, the ghost anole, is a species of lizard in the family Dactyloidae. The species is found in Mexico, Guatemala, Belize, El Salvador, Honduras, Nicaragua, Costa Rica, Panama, and Colombia.

References

Anoles
Reptiles described in 1861
Taxa named by Edward Drinker Cope